Langley High School is a public high school within the Fairfax County Public Schools in McLean, Virginia, United States.

History

Langley High School was established in 1965. "Langley", meaning 'long open meadow', honors Thomas Lee's home estate in Shropshire, England, "Langley Manor". Thomas Lee was one of the first to envision the Thirteen Colonies as a separate nation whose capital should be on the Potomac between Great Falls and Little Falls. Keeping these things in mind (including the Anglo-Saxon background), the school steering committee chose the nickname 'Saxons' and the school's colors of forest green and old gold with white as a trim color in keeping with the traditional theme."

Admissions
Langley's boundaries extend west of State Route 123 (Dolley Madison Boulevard) and north of both State Route 7 (Leesburg Pike) and State Route 267 (Dulles Toll Road) from McLean to Great Falls, ending at the Loudoun County line.  Small parts of Vienna, Reston, and Herndon along the south side of Route 7 are also within the school's attendance area.

Until 1994, areas west of Springvale Road in Great Falls were within the Herndon High School boundaries.  After leaving Forestville Elementary School, students attended Herndon Middle and Herndon High School. When Buzz Aldrin Elementary School was preparing to open, Langley High School was then under-enrolled; some residents from the Forestville attendance area requested reassignment of their neighborhoods from the Herndon High to the Langley High School pyramid. As a result, school officials shifted Langley's boundary line west from Springvale Road to the Loudoun County border.

During the 2011 Fairfax County School Board elections, then School Board Chair, Jane Strauss, took credit for having "prevented changes to the Langley High School boundaries" for 18 years and for having "fought off" attempts to redistrict "current neighborhoods out of Langley".

Demographics

The student body was 69.50% White, 20.87% Asian, 4.59% Hispanic, 1.18% Black, and 3.86% Other during the 2012–13 academic school year. In the 2011–12 school year, Langley High School's student body was 71.15% White, 19.20% Asian, 4.60% Hispanic, 1.70% Black and 3.35% Other.

Curriculum

The LHS academic program follows standard Virginia guidelines, requiring 24 credits for graduation. Additionally provided at Langley is the Advanced Placement (AP) program.  Langley offers one of the most comprehensive AP programs available, featuring more than 20 AP-level classes in every discipline. Significant courses include the school's Multivariable Calculus and Linear Algebra classes, as well as the only Russian courses offered in a Fairfax County Public High School outside of Thomas Jefferson High School for Science and Technology. Langley also used to contain a unique humanities department for the high school level. Students would enroll in paired English and History classes, where the curriculum paralleled one another. The humanities department was split for the 2012–2013 school year in favor of optional tied classes.

Langley High School is ranked as one of the top high schools in the United States and the state of Virginia. In 2021, U.S. News & World Report listed LHS as the second-best high school in Virginia, with Thomas Jefferson High School for Science and Technology ranked as the first. Langley was ranked 156th in the United States in 2021.

Extracurricular activities

Relay For Life of Langley-McLean
Since 2013, Langley High School has been host to the American Cancer Society's Relay For Life of Langley-McLean, an overnight fundraising event that has raised over $170,000 for the ACS since its 2013 Inaugural Event held on Saturday, April 27, 2013. The event is one of only two student-led Relay For Life fundraisers held in Virginia and received the American Cancer Society's "Youth Event of the Year" Award in the South Atlantic Region for their 2013 event. In 2014 & 2015, Relay For Life of Langley-McLean partnered with McLean High School to expand and increase the event's reach in the local community.

The 2014 Relay For Life of Langley-McLean was held from Saturday, April 26 at 6:00 PM to Sunday, April 27 at 6:00 AM and succeeded in raising $110,366.78 for the American Cancer Society. The 2015 event was held on May 16, 2015, and raised over $112,000.

Model United Nations
The team from Langley High School's Model United Nations (MUN) was nationally ranked as a Top-15 high school MUN team by the Model UN consulting organization Best Delegate in the 2013–2014 school year.

Since then, Langley High School has won Best Large at national conferences hosted across the East Coast. In 2017, Langley's MUN team won Best Large Delegation at the circuit's conference, ILMUNC XXXIII.

In 2014, the club hosted its own inaugural high school Model UN conference, the Virginia Invitational Model United Nations Conference I (VIMUNC), attracting over 700 delegates.

South Asian Student Association

The school had an active South Asian Student Association (SASA), which holds an annual "International Night". In 2014, Langley SASA hosted its first District-Wide charity event "Bollywood Bash". CHORD, the organization the association is raising money for, promotes literacy and strengthens local government in rural India.

Student publications 
Langley's award-winning student newsmagazine is The Saxon Scope.

Additionally, The Saxon Scope publishes a catalog of student-produced literature and artwork in an annual magazine titled "Kaleidoscope."

Langley's yearbook is The Shire.

Music Department
Langley's music department consists of award-winning band, choral, and orchestral programs.

The band program comprises six bands: Percussion Ensemble, Symphonic Band, Wind Ensemble, Wind Symphony, Marching Band, and Jazz Band. Langley also has a marching band that performs at home football games and state marching band competitions, which is accompanied by the award-winning Color Guard team. The Langley Band performed in Spain in 2014, Chicago in 2015, and Los Angeles in 2016. The Wind Symphony performed in Indianapolis in 2017 at the prestigious Music For All National Festival. In 2018, it traveled to Italy, performing in cathedrals in Rome and Florence.

The choral program consists of five choirs: Treble, Women's Select, Concert, Chamber, and Madrigals. Langley Choirs have competed in competitions in Prague, Salzburg, and domestically in Orlando and San Diego.

The orchestral program consists of three orchestras: Symphonic, Sinfonietta, and Philharmonic.

Science Fair
Langley High School participates in science fair events. Each year, first and second-place winners from the school-hosted science fair are selected to attend the Fairfax County Science and Engineering Fair. The Fairfax County Science and Engineering Fair is an Intel International Science and Engineering Fair (ISEF) affiliated fair, sending around ten projects each year to the international fair. Notable winners from the past have included:
 (2009) Jun Sup Lee – 4th Place Grand Prize in Mathematics at the competition in Reno, Nevada.
 (2010) Jong Hyuck Won – Grand Prize Winner and Best of Category in Medicine and Health Sciences at the competition in San Jose, California.
 (2011) Kelly Martins – 3rd Place Grand Prize in Environmental Management at the competition in Los Angeles.
 (2012) Jason Cui – 4th Place Grand Prize in Medicine and Health Sciences at the competition in Pittsburgh, Pennsylvania.

Other activities

Langley's fashion department sponsors an annual fashion show in Langley's auditorium.

Langley's Science Olympiad team consistently receives accolades at the state and national levels. In 2015, they beat out the Thomas Jefferson High School for Science and Technology at the Virginia state tournament to secure a spot at the national tournament.

Athletics

Langley plays in the AAA Liberty District of the Northern Region.  The Langley sports teams are all referred to as the "Saxons.".

The football team won the Northern Region and went to the state finals in 1993.

The boys' wrestling team won the Liberty District Tournament for 11 years straight (2001–2011). In addition, it was the Northern Region champion in 2007.

In 2009, 2010, and 2011, Langley's AAA boys' lacrosse team won the state championship.

The Boys' Swim and Dive Team won the VHSL State Championships in 2017–2018, their first State Victory in Langley's history.

The Girls' Tennis won the Northern Region title in 2011, then went undefeated in 2012 to sweep the district, regional, and state titles.

Langley High School Boys' Soccer team won its first Virginia State Championship in 2015, second in 2017, and third in 2022. At the end of the 2014–2015 soccer year,  Langley's boys' varsity team held the rank of No. 4 in the country by soccer publication TopDrawerSoccer.com.

Langley High School's mascot is Otto the Saxon.

State championships
Langley has won 53 championships, which are:
 Girls Volleyball 2013, 2017
 Boys Lacrosse  2009, 2010, 2011, 2012
 Girls Tennis 1979, 1980, 1986, 1987, 1988, 1991, 1992, 2012, 2022
 Girls Swim and Dive 1998, 1999, 2000, 2001, 2011, 2015
 Boys Golf 1983, 1984, 2001, 2011, 2016, 2017, 2018, 2019, 2020, 2021, 2022
 Girls Gymnastics 2004
 Boys Tennis 1986, 1987, 1988, 1991, 1992, 1994
 Softball 1992
 Girls Cross-Country 1983, 1984, 2021
 Boys Cross-Country 1979
 Scholastic Bowl 2014, 2015, 2016
 Boys Soccer 2015, 2017, 2022
 Boys Swim and Dive 2018
 Girls Lacrosse, 2019, 2021
 Field Hockey, 2019

Langley has received two sportsmanship awards, one in AAA girls soccer in 2001 and one in AAA girls volleyball in 2007.  In addition, Langley won first place in the Wachovia Cup standings in 1991–1992 for athletics.

United States Congressional Baseball Game
In 1977 rain forced the Congressional Baseball Game to play the annual game on Langley High School's baseball field after two previous rainouts on Memorial Stadium.

Saxon Stage 
Saxon Stage is the theatre department for Langley High School. The department produces two mainstage productions annually, one play and one musical.

VHSL One-Act Play Competition 
Saxon Stage is a regular Class 6 competitor in the Virginia High School League (VHSL) One-Act Play Competition.

For the first time in Saxon Stage's history, Langley High School became the VHSL Liberty Conference 6A one-act competition champions in January 2014 when they won first place with its production of Fearful Symmetry. The production later won third place in the Region 6A North Competition, making it the highest-ranked student-directed production of the competition.

In March 2019, Langley High School won first place at the VHSL Class 6 State Competition with its production of Peter Tolan's comedic Pillowtalk. The two actors received Outstanding Actor commendations at the state level.

In February 2020, A Jury of Her Peers placed third in the Region 6 North Competition after winning first place at the sectional competition one month prior.

In 2021, Never Swim Alone placed first in the district, regional, and state VHSL competition.

List of productions 

*Indicates Cappies Program entry

As a result of the COVID-19 pandemic, the 2020 production of Guys and Dolls was canceled, and both Hey Stranger and The Party Hop were performed virtually.

The Cappies 
Langley High School participates in the National Capital Area division of the Cappies Critics and Awards Program for High School Theatre, "a year-long program for theatre and journalism students through which students attend and discuss each other's shows, write reviews for publication, and at the end of the season decide who of their colleague student performers and technicians should be honored for awards."

Below is a list of all Cappie Awards and nominations received by Saxon Stage since 2012.

List of Cappie Awards and nominations

Notable alumni
Timothy C. May, freshman year only, cypherpunk and former chief scientist at Intel
Matt Kaufmann, 1970, computer scientist and winner of the 2005 ACM Software System Award
Richard Leigh, 1970, songwriter
Bruce Allen, 1974, former Team President of the Washington Commanders
G. David Low, 1974, astronaut
Anne Holton, 1976 (Junior & Senior Year), President of George Mason University, Former Secretary of Education for the Commonwealth of Virginia (2014–2016), Former First Lady of Virginia (2006–2010)
Michael J. Hicks, 1980, economist
Jim Hagedorn, 1981, politician
Elizabeth Moore Aubin, 1983, United States Ambassador to Algeria
Michael Arndt, 1984, Academy Award-winning screenwriter, Little Miss Sunshine
Lauren Graham, 1985, actress
Steve Czaban, 1986, radio personality
Juliet Huddy, 1987, The Morning Show
James Gordon Meek, 1987, ABC News producer
Paula Cale, 1988, actress
J. Meejin Yoon, 1990, architect, architectural educator, co-principal at Howeler + Yoon Architecture and Dean of the Cornell University College of Architecture, Art, and Planning
Jeremy Stoppelman, 1995, Co-Founder and CEO of Yelp
Lauren Shehadi, 2001, sportscaster
Jay Sborz, 2003, former professional baseball pitcher
Jack Abraham, 2004, entrepreneur and investor
Ashley Iaconetti, 2006, TV personality from The Bachelor
Ross Butler, 2008, actor
Armin Mahbanoozadeh, 2009, figure skater

References

High schools in Fairfax County, Virginia
Northern Virginia Scholastic Hockey League teams
Educational institutions established in 1965
McLean, Virginia
Public high schools in Virginia
1965 establishments in Virginia